Costikyan is a surname. Notable people with the surname include:

Barbara Costikyan (1928–2020), American food writer
Edward N. Costikyan (1924–2012), American politician
Greg Costikyan (born 1959), American game designer and science fiction writer
Granger Kent Costikyan (1907–1998), American banker